The 2016 Big South women's basketball tournament is an upcoming postseason women's basketball tournament for the Big South Conference that will take place March 10–13, 2015, at the Kimmel Arena in Asheville, North Carolina. All rounds after 1st are broadcast on ESPN3, 1st Round on Big South Network.

Format
All 11 teams were eligible for the tournament.

Seeds

Schedule

*Game times in Eastern Time. #Rankings denote tournament seeding.

Bracket

See also
 2016 Big South Conference men's basketball tournament

References

Big South
Big South Conference women's basketball tournament